The Ridin' Kid from Powder River is a 1924 American silent Western film directed by Edward Sedgwick and starring Hoot Gibson. It was based on a novel by Henry Herbert Knibbs and produced and distributed by Universal Pictures.

Plot
As described in a film magazine, Bud Watkins (House), a lad of ten years who does not know who his parents are, has become the abused, half-starved property of an itinerant horse trader whose territory is the cattle country of Arizona — as a trader — and of Nevada as a horse thief. It is the period when farmers are contesting against the cattleman for the open range, and by fortuitous chance the lad becomes the ward of a farmer who is killed a few years later by cattlemen. The lad (Gibson) vows to avenge his death and soon becomes known throughout the country as "The Rambler" by reason of the fact that he is always riding across country and searching for the murderers. Through hazardous adventure he becomes associated with some desperate characters, who, however, have retained some spark of humanity, and in the leader this is represented by his love for his beautiful daughter (Hulette), just merging into womanhood. Escaping many traps by shooting his way to safety, "The Rambler" finally keeps his vow, comes to happiness — and then his country calls him to oppose the armies of Spain.

Cast

Preservation status
An incomplete print of The Ridin' Kid from Powder River consisting of 2 reels is preserved in the George Eastman House in Rochester.

See also
 Hoot Gibson filmography
 Gertrude Astor filmography

References

External links

 
 

1924 films
Films directed by Edward Sedgwick
Universal Pictures films
Films based on American novels
Films based on Canadian novels
Films based on Western (genre) novels
1924 Western (genre) films
American black-and-white films
Silent American Western (genre) films
1920s American films
Films with screenplays by Richard Schayer
American films about revenge
1920s English-language films